Elver may refer to: 

 Elver (fish), a juvenile eel
 Elver pass, a river construction that allows fish & eels to migrate freely
 Elver Eating World Championships

People 
 Elmore Elver
 Hilal Elver
 Helena Elver
 Élver James Melchor Bañol